The Indiana State University Marching Sycamores, is the marching band of Indiana State University. The Marching Sycamores are the university's musical ambassadors, and are one of the most active and visible student organizations on campus, with a long and proud tradition. In addition to performing at all home games, the Marching Sycamores have performed for half time shows at games of the NFL's Chicago Bears and Indianapolis Colts, the Brickyard 400 NASCAR race, National Bands of America Finals, the Mid-States Marching Band Contest, and several other exhibition performances throughout the region.

The Marching Sycamores first appeared on campus in 1933, with 42 members and a drum major. The band played at every football and basketball home game, as well as baseball games against Purdue and Indiana University. An all-male organization until 1942, the Sycamores admitted 20 females in order to replace members serving overseas in World War II, and has remained co-educational since. In 2020 the band did not field a halftime show due to the Coronavirus Pandemic. Since then, the band's numbers have continued to drop from a decades-long high of 180 members in 2017, due to the instability of the ISU School of Music.

References

Marching Sycamores

Notable alumni
  Noma Gurich - Chief Justice of the Supreme Court of Oklahoma (2019); Gurich was a member of the Marching Sycamores 1971–75.

External links
Official Website - Sycamore Bands

Indiana State University
Musical groups from Indiana
Musical groups established in 1933
Missouri Valley Football Conference marching bands
1933 establishments in Indiana